The Interactive Disassembler (IDA) is a disassembler for computer software which generates assembly language source code from machine-executable code. It supports a variety of executable formats for different processors and operating systems. It can also be used as a debugger for Windows PE, Mac OS X Mach-O, and Linux ELF executables. A decompiler plug-in, which generates a high level, C source code-like representation of the analysed program, is available at extra cost.

IDA is used widely in software reverse engineering, including for malware analysis and software vulnerability research. IDA has been referred to as the "de-facto industry standard disassembler".

History 
Ilfak Guilfanov began working on IDA in 1991, and initially distributed it as a shareware application. In 1996, the Belgian company DataRescue took over the development of IDA and began to sell it as a commercial product, under the name IDA Pro.

Initial versions of IDA did not have a graphical user interface (GUI), and ran as an extended DOS, OS/2, or Windows console application. In 1999, DataRescue released the first version of IDA Pro with a GUI, IDA Pro 4.0.

In 2005, Guilfanov founded Hex-Rays to pursue the development of the Hex-Rays Decompiler IDA extension. In January 2008, Hex-Rays assumed the development and support of DataRescue's IDA Pro.

Features 
IDA disassembles a compiled program back into an assembly language representation. In addition to performing basic disassembly, IDA also automatically annotates disassembled programs with information about:

 cross-references between code and data in the program
 function locations, function stack frames, and function calling conventions
 reconstructed data types

However, the nature of disassembly precludes total accuracy, and a great deal of human intervention is necessarily required; IDA has interactive functionality to aid in improving the disassembly. A typical IDA user will begin with an automatically generated disassembly listing and then convert sections from code to data and vice versa, rename, annotate, and otherwise add information to the listing, until its functionality becomes clear.

Scripting 
"IDC scripts" make it possible to extend the operation of the disassembler. Some helpful scripts are provided, which can serve as the basis for user written scripts. Most frequently scripts are used for extra modification of the generated code. For example, external symbol tables can be loaded thereby using the function names of the original source code. 

Users have created plugins that allow other common scripting languages to be used instead of, or in addition to, IDC.  IdaRUB supports Ruby and IDAPython adds support for Python. As of version 5.4, IDAPython (dependent on Python 2.5) comes preinstalled with IDA Pro.

Debugging 
IDA Pro supports a number of debuggers, including:

 Remote Windows, Linux, and Mac applications (provided by Hex-Rays) allow running an executable in its native environment (presumably using a virtual machine for malware)
 GNU Debugger (gdb) is supported on Linux and OS X, as well as the native Windows debugger
 A Bochs plugin is provided for debugging simple applications (i.e., damaged UPX or mpress compacted executables)
 An Intel PIN-based debugger
 A trace replayer

Versions 
The latest full version of IDA Pro is commercial (version 8.2 as of December 2022), while a less capable version, named IDA Free, is available for download free of cost.

Supported systems/processors/compilers
 System hosts
 Windows x86 and ARM
 Linux x86
  x86
 Recognized executable file formats
 COFF and derivatives, including Win32/64/generic PE
 ELF and derivatives (generic)
 Mach-O (Mach)
 NLM (NetWare)
 LC/LE/LX (OS/2 3.x and various DOS extenders)
 NE (OS/2 2.x, Win16, and various DOS extenders)
 MZ (MS-DOS)
 OMF and derivatives (generic)
 AIM (generic)
 raw binary, such as a ROM image or a COM file
 Instruction sets
 Intel 80x86 family
 ARM architecture
 Motorola 68k and H8
 Zilog Z80
 MOS 6502
 Intel i860
 DEC Alpha
 Analog Devices ADSP218x
 Angstrem KR1878
 Atmel AVR series
 DEC series PDP11
 Fujitsu F2MC16L/F2MC16LX
 Fujitsu FR 32-bit Family
 Hitachi SH3/SH3B/SH4/SH4B
 Hitachi H8: h8300/h8300a/h8s300/h8500
 Intel 196 series: 80196/80196NP
 Intel 51 series: 8051/80251b/80251s/80930b/80930s
 Intel i960 series
 Intel Itanium (ia64) series
 Java virtual machine
 MIPS: mipsb/mipsl/mipsr/mipsrl/r5900b/r5900l
 Microchip PIC: PIC12Cxx/PIC16Cxx/PIC18Cxx
 MSIL
 Mitsubishi 7700 Family: m7700/m7750
 Mitsubishi m32/m32rx
 Mitsubishi m740
 Mitsubishi m7900
 Motorola DSP 5600x Family: dsp561xx/dsp5663xx/dsp566xx/dsp56k
 Motorola ColdFire
 Motorola HCS12
 NEC 78K0/78K0S
 PA-RISC
 PowerPC
 Xenon PowerPC Family
 SGS-Thomson ST20/ST20c4/ST7
 SPARC Family
 Samsung SAM8
 Siemens C166 series
 TMS320Cxxx series
 Compiler/libraries (for automatic library function recognition)
 Borland C++ 5.x for DOS/Windows
 Borland C++ 3.1
 Borland C Builder v4 for DOS/Windows
 GNU C++ for Cygwin
 Microsoft C
 Microsoft QuickC
 Microsoft Visual C++
 Watcom C++ (16/32 bit) for DOS/OS2
 ARM C v1.2
 GNU C++ for Unix/common

See also 
 Ghidra
 JEB
 Radare2
 Binary Ninja
 Cheat engine

References

Further reading

External links
 
 
 
 

Disassemblers
Debuggers
Software for modeling software